Dongsheng Township is a township of Anyue County in eastern Sichuan province, China, located around  west of the border with Chongqing Municipality and  east of the county seat. , it has 11 villages under its administration.

See also 
 List of township-level divisions of Sichuan

References 

Township-level divisions of Sichuan
Anyue County